Anthony A W Kitcher  (born 18 March 1941), is a British former diver who competed for England in the 1964 Summer Olympics.

He represented England and won a bronze medal in the 10 metres platform at the 1962 British Empire and Commonwealth Games in Perth, Western Australia.

References

1941 births
English male divers
Commonwealth Games medallists in diving
Commonwealth Games bronze medallists for England
Divers at the 1962 British Empire and Commonwealth Games
Olympic divers of Great Britain
Divers at the 1964 Summer Olympics
Living people
Medallists at the 1962 British Empire and Commonwealth Games